The Liangmai people, are a Tibeto-Burmese ethnic group inhabits Nagaland and Manipur states of Northeast India. Their villages are mostly spread across Peren district in Nagaland and Tamenglong, Senapati in Manipur.

References

www.nambon.com - Zeliangrong Community Website

Naga people
Ethnic groups in Manipur